Tahina spectabilis, the tahina palm, also called blessed palm or dimaka is a species of gigantic palm (family Arecaceae, or Palmae) that is found only in the Analalava District of northwestern Madagascar where its range is only twelve acres (4.8 hectares), one of the most extreme examples of endemism known. The trunk is up to twenty inches (51 centimeters) thick, and sculpted with the most conspicuous leaf scars of any tree. An individual tree was discovered when in flower in 2007; it was first described the following year as a result of photographs being sent to Kew Gardens in the United Kingdom for identification. The palm is thought to live for up to fifty years before producing an enormous inflorescence up to nineteen feet (eight meters) in height and width, surpassed in size only by Corypha spp. and by Metroxylon salomonense and being monocarpic subsequently  dying. The inflorescence, a panicle, consists of hundreds, perhaps thousands, of three-flowered clusters which bloom in three consecutive, synchronized "cohorts" or flushes of bloom. The nearest equivalent pattern of flowering is in the flowering vine Bougainvillea where the three flowers bloom sequentially, but not synchronized. Fewer than one hundred adult  individuals of the species are thought to exist and the International Union for Conservation of Nature has rated it as "critically endangered".

Taxonomy
The species, which produces countless flowers and (after fruiting) dies, is sufficiently different from other known palms to justify the creation of the monotypic genus Tahina, which is now included with three other genera in the tribe Chuniophoeniceae; the other members being found in the Arabian peninsula, Thailand and China. Fewer than one hundred individuals of the species are thought to exist.

Description

Tahina spectabilis normally appears much like other palms. However, when it flowers, which John Dransfield of the Royal Botanic Gardens, Kew estimates as occurring after 30 to 50 years, the stem tip grows a large inflorescence that bursts into branches of hundreds of flowers. The drain on nutrients this display entails results in the death of the organism within several months.

Discovery
The tahina palm was discovered by French cashew plantation manager Xavier Metz and his family, who were strolling through a remote northwestern region of Madagascar in 2007 when they came across a flowering individual and sent photos to the Kew Gardens for identification.

Its name is derived from "Tahina", a Malagasy word meaning "to be protected" or "blessed", being the given name of Anne-Tahina Metz, the daughter of its discoverer, while "spectabilis" means spectacular in Latin.

It was subsequently chosen as one of the top ten species discoveries of 2008 by the International Institute for Species Exploration.

References

External links

Coryphoideae
Endemic flora of Madagascar
Plants described in 2008
Critically endangered plants